Emopamil binding protein is a protein that in humans is encoded by the EBP gene, located on the X chromosome. The protein is shown to have a high-affinity reception for anti-ischemic drugs, such as Emopamil, resulting in its discovery and given name. EBP has a mass of 27.3 kDa and resembles a σ-receptor that resides in the endoplasmic reticulum of various tissues as an integral membrane protein.

Clinical significance 
Mutations in EBP cause Conradi–Hünermann syndrome and impairs cholesterol biosynthesis. Unborn males affected with EBP mutations are not expected to be liveborn, (with up to only 5% male births). Individuals, mostly female, that are liveborn with EBP mutations experience stunted growth, limb reduction and back problems. Later in life, the individual may develop cataracts along with coarse hair and hair loss.

Cloning 
Isolation, replication and characterization of the EBP and EBP-like protein have been performed in yeast/E. Coli strains (which lack the EBP protein in nature) to study the high-affinity drug binding effects.

See also 
 Emopamil
Cholestenol Delta-isomerase
Sigma-1 receptor
Sigma-2 receptor

References

External links 
  GeneReviews/NCBI/NIH/UW entry on Chondrodysplasia Punctata 2, X-Linked, Conradi-Hünermann Syndrome, Happle Syndrome
 

Genetics